Time Stand Still is the sixth studio album by American rock band the Hooters, released in Europe on September 14, 2007, and released in the US on February 5, 2008.

Background
The Hooters gathered in October 2006 at keyboard player Rob Hyman's Elmstreet Studios, in suburban Philadelphia, Pennsylvania, for the recording of basic tracks, followed by additional recording at guitarist Eric Bazilian's Red Door Recording studio.

Several of the songs on the album had been previewed during the Hooters' live shows in 2005 and 2006, with one of the tracks, "Until You Dare," originally recorded on Bazilian's 2000 solo album The Optimist.

There is a cover version of Don Henley's 1984 song "The Boys of Summer" that came about as a result of Hyman and Bazilian being asked to participate in a show for the VH1 Save the Music Foundation in New York City, where bands from the 1980s were asked to play their own songs while also choosing a song that they wished that they had written from the 1980s. After performing the song as part of their live shows the previous two years, they decided to record a studio version for inclusion on the album.

The final mixes were completed in May 2007.

Release Schedule
The album was commercially released in Germany, Austria and Switzerland on September 14, 2007, with pre-release copies available during the band's summer tour of Europe from June through August, featuring shows in Germany, Sweden, The Netherlands and Switzerland.  The album was released in the United States on February 5, 2008 and was released in other countries in early 2008.

Track listing

Personnel
The Hooters
Eric Bazilian – lead vocals, guitars, bass, mandolin, harmonica, recorder, keyboards, piano, saxophone
Rob Hyman – lead vocals, piano, keyboards, acoustic guitar, mandolin, accordion, melodica
John Lilley – guitar, mandolin, dobro
Fran Smith Jr. – bass, backing vocals
David Uosikkinen – drums

Technical
Eric Bazilian – producer
Rob Hyman – producer
John O. Senior – engineer
Jesse Honig – assistant engineer
George Marino – mastering
Paul Hammond – technician
Graham Perry – art direction
Lauren Lyons – photography
Lisa Schaffer – photography
Stephan Kohler, Hans-Georg Krumm, Candy Langbein, Douglas A. Lockard, Brigitte Morgenstern, Graham Perry – live photos

References

External links
TIME STANDS STILL FOR THE HOOTERS CO-FRONTMAN ROB HYMAN, iF Magazine, March 6, 2008
The Hooters dance again, Daily News, March 2, 2008
Hooters 'Time' again, The Philadelphia Inquirer, February 5, 2008
Still Hooter-Rific, Philadelphia Daily News, February 5, 2008

2007 albums
The Hooters albums
Albums produced by Eric Bazilian
Albums produced by Rob Hyman